The Forssa Program (Finnish: Forssan ohjelma) is a political declaration issued by the Labour Party of Finland at its party convention in Forssa, Finland in August 1903. At the same time the party was renamed Social Democratic Party of Finland. The program served as the official platform of the Social Democratic Party until 1952.

Contents

The Forssa Program was based on the program of the Social Democratic Party of Austria and the Erfurt Program issued by the Social Democratic Party of Germany. It included the following eleven claims:

1. Universal suffrage, proportional representation, unicameralism and secret ballot

2. Direct democracy

3. Freedom of association, assembly, speech and the press

4. Free and mandatory education

5. Separation of church and state and abolition of religious education

6. Introduction of a progressive income tax

7. Free trial and legal aid and compensation for false indictments

8. Publicly funded health care

9. Abolition of conscription and promotion of pacifism

10. Gender equality under law

11. Prohibition of alcohol

Votes and elections
The most significant unfulfilled list requirement is the right to vote. Of paragraph 1, only the right to elect has been exercised. The literal content of the Forssa list in that regard (Items 1 and 2) was; 

1. Universal, equal and direct election and voting rights for all Finnish citizens aged 21 and over, regardless of gender, in all elections and voting in both municipal and state sectors. Relative representation and single chamber system. Secret ballot. Conduct of elections and voting on public holidays. Remuneration for elected representatives in all fields.

2. Direct legislative right for the people through the right to propose and reject laws.

In paragraph 1, a clear distinction is made between elections and voting. The right to participate on elections has been designated as the elections right and the right to vote has been designated as the voting right. Elections and voting have been deemed necessary in both the municipal and state sectors. The most important meaning of voting is specified in item 2 of the list. To date, the Finnish people have not had the right to immediately (Directly) propose and vote on laws. In general, the Finnish people have only been allowed to vote twice in opinion polls, once for Alcohol in 1931 and about EU in 1994. 

The Finnish people therefore do not have the right to vote within the meaning of the Forssa program.

References

Social Democratic Party of Finland
Party platforms